Idrettslaget Ulfstind is a Norwegian sports club from Tromsø, Troms. It has sections for association football and skiing

It was founded as a sports section of UL Ulfstind on 2 April 1966, and IL Ulfstind became a separate entity on 10 January 1981. In 1992 it incorporated the club UL Samhug.

The men's football team currently plays in the Fifth Division, the sixth tier of Norwegian football. It last played in the Norwegian Second Division in 1998.

References

External links
 Official site 

Football clubs in Norway
Sport in Tromsø
Association football clubs established in 1966
1966 establishments in Norway